Sonny Rollins, Vol. 2 is a jazz album by Sonny Rollins. It was released in 1957 on Blue Note Records, catalogue BLP 1558. It is noted for the appearance of pianists Thelonious Monk and Horace Silver, both playing on the Monk composition "Misterioso". Monk also plays on his composition "Reflections", while Silver handles the piano duties on all the other tracks.

It was reissued in 1999 as part of the Rudy Van Gelder series, remastering done by the audio engineer, also present on the original recording sessions.

British singer-songwriter Joe Jackson paid homage to the album when he mimicked the sleeve for his 1984 album Body and Soul.

Track listing

Side one
"Why Don't I?" (Rollins) – 5:44
"Wail March" (Rollins) – 6:11
"Misterioso" (Monk, Denzil Best) – 9:24

Side two
"Reflections" (Monk) – 7:03
"You Stepped Out of a Dream" (Nacio Herb Brown, Gus Kahn) – 6:24
"Poor Butterfly" (Raymond Hubbell, John Golden) – 6:06

Personnel
 Sonny Rollins – tenor saxophone
 J. J. Johnson – trombone (except 4)
 Horace Silver – piano (except 4)
 Thelonious Monk – piano (3, 4)
 Paul Chambers – bass
 Art Blakey – drums

References

Sonny Rollins albums
1957 albums
Blue Note Records albums
Albums produced by Alfred Lion
Albums recorded at Van Gelder Studio